The Cermak Road Bridge Historic District is a national historic district in the Lower West Side neighborhood of Chicago, Illinois. The district includes the Cermak Road Bridge, which carries Cermak Road across the Chicago River, and four buildings clustered around the bridge. The bridge opened in 1906 and is a rare surviving example of a Scherzer rolling lift bridge in Chicago. The four buildings, all originally factories or warehouses, represent the growth of industry along the river in the early twentieth century. Sites along the river provided access not only to transportation on the river itself but also to the many railroads in the area.

The district was added to the National Register of Historic Places on May 1, 2012.

References

Historic districts on the National Register of Historic Places in Illinois
Historic districts in Chicago
Road bridges on the National Register of Historic Places in Illinois
Industrial buildings and structures on the National Register of Historic Places in Chicago